The Buchwaldskopf is a hill in the southern foothills of Mount Nickel in the Taunus near Oberjosbach, Niedernhausen in Hesse, Germany.

Geography

Position 

The Buchwaldskopf rises in the Eichelberger Mark as part of the Taunushauptkamm. In the Taunus Nature Park it is located in the district of Oberjosbach of the municipality of Niedernhausen, which is situated on the south-eastern flank of the Josbach.

References 

Hills of Hesse
Mountains and hills of the Taunus
High Taunus